The 1994 European Parliamentary election was a European election held across the 12 European Union member states in June 1994.

This election saw the merge of the European People's Party and European Democrats, an increase in the overall number of seats (567 members were elected to the European Parliament) and a fall in overall turnout to 57%.

The five years which had passed since the previous election had seen enormous political upheavals across the continent. These changes included the end of communism in Europe, German reunification, the dissolution of the Soviet Union, the Velvet Divorce in Czechoslovakia and the breakup of Yugoslavia. The integration of five former East German states and Berlin into the Federal Republic of Germany had constituted the first physical expansion of the EC since 1986. The end of the Cold War meant three politically neutral states in Europe had begun a process of acceding to the EU that would culminate in the 1995 enlargement of the European Union. The EU itself had assumed its current name through adoption of the Treaty of Maastricht in 1993.

Results

The Technical Group of the European Right no longer had enough MEPs to qualify as a Group, and its MEPs returned for the time being to the ranks of the independents. The members of the European Democrats joined the European People's Party (EPP), some as associate members such as the British Conservatives who did not wish to subscribe to the EPP's pro-federalist position. Despite the merger, the EPP failed one more to become the largest party; the Party of European Socialists once more claimed victory, with a 41-seat lead over the People's Party.

Forza Italia was elected for the first time in 1994; it formed its own shortlived group, Forza Europa, before this merged with the European Democratic Alliance a year after the election to become the Group Union for Europe. In addition to Forza Europa, another new group was founded following the fall of the European Right group: the Europe of Nations Group (Coordination Group)—the first Eurosceptic group in the Parliament, which lasted until 1996.

Results by country 
The national results as at 9–12 June 1994 are as follows:

Statistics

Seat distribution

The number of seats was changed to accommodate Austria, Finland and Sweden who were joining the following year, holding elections then. They were granted 21,16 and 22 seats respectively. The total number of seats increased from 518 to 567.

External links
 The election of the Members of the European Parliament European Navigator
 Full Election Details Europe Politique

 
1994 elections in Europe
June 1994 events in Europe